TNO can stand for:

Astronomy
 Thai National Observatory, atop Doi Inthanon
 Trans-Neptunian object, a class of minor planet

Technology
 , a French thermonuclear warhead
 TNO intestinal model,  computer modelling of GI tract physiology
 Trust no one (Internet security), a software design approach
 Wolfenstein: The New Order, a video game released in 2014

Other uses
 , Francophones in Canada's Northwest Territories
 , the Netherlands Organisation for Applied Scientific Research
 Tamarindo Airport, Costa Rica (IATA code: TNO)